Saw Pa Oh was a queen consort of King Kyaswa of Sagaing. She was a daughter of King Uzana I of Pinya. She and Kyaswa had at least one daughter named Saw Sala who became a queen of King Uzana II of Pinya.

Notes

References

Bibliography
 
 
 
 
 

Myinsaing dynasty
Queens consort of Sagaing